During the 2017–18 season, Levante UD participated in La Liga and the Copa del Rey. This was the 109th season in Levante UD ’s history and the 12th in the Primera División.

Squad

Transfers
List of Spanish football transfers summer 2017#Levante

In

Out

Competitions

Overall

Liga

League table

Matches

-->

Copa del Rey

Round of 32

Round of 16

Statistics

Appearances and goals
Last updated on 20 May 2018.

|-
! colspan=14 style=background:#dcdcdc; text-align:center|Goalkeepers

|-
! colspan=14 style=background:#dcdcdc; text-align:center|Defenders

|-
! colspan=14 style=background:#dcdcdc; text-align:center|Midfielders

|-
! colspan=14 style=background:#dcdcdc; text-align:center|Forwards

|-
! colspan=14 style=background:#dcdcdc; text-align:center| Players who have made an appearance or had a squad number this season but have left the club

|-
|}

Cards
Accounts for all competitions. Last updated on 22 December 2017.

Clean sheets
Last updated on 22 December 2017.

References

Levante UD seasons
Levante UD